Danuta Czech (1922 – 4 April 2004) was a Polish Holocaust historian and deputy director of the Auschwitz-Birkenau State Museum in Oświęcim, Poland. She is known for her book The Auschwitz Chronicle: 1939–1945 (1990).

Background
Czech was born in Humniska, Poland. During World War II and the German occupation of Poland, her father, Stefan Czech, was a member of the Home Army who spent time in the Auschwitz, Buchenwald and Dora-Mittelbau concentration camps. Czech attended the St. Kinga gymnasium in Tarnów, graduating in 1939, then the commercial lyceum, also in Tarnów, in 1941. According to the museum, she became a member of the Polish resistance, along with her father. From 1946 to 1952, she studied sociology at Jagiellonian University, Kraków, obtaining a master of philosophy degree. In 1955 she began work as a researcher with the Auschwitz-Birkenau State Museum, eventually becoming its deputy director.

The Auschwitz Chronicle
Almost 1,000 pages in length, The Auschwitz Chronicle is a meticulous chronicle of events in the Auschwitz concentration camp from construction to liberation. According to the Auschwitz museum, the book became Czech's life's work: "No serious scholarly work on Auschwitz could fail to cite her study."

Selected works
(1984) with Jadwiga Bezwinska (eds.). KL Auschwitz Seen by the SS: Höss, Broad, Kremer. New York: Howard Fertig.
(1990). The Auschwitz Chronicle: 1939–1945. New York: Holt. First published in installments by the Auschwitz-Birkenau State Museum in 1958–1963. Also published as Kalendarium wydarzen w obozie Koncentracyjnm Auschwitz-Birkenau 1939–1945.
(1996) with Franciszek Piper and Teresa Świebocka. Auschwitz: Nazi death camp. Oświęcim: Auschwitz-Birkenau State Museum.
(2000). "A Calendar of the Most Important Events in the History of the Auschwitz Concentration Camp". In

References

1922 births
2004 deaths
Historians of the Holocaust in Poland
Academic staff of Jagiellonian University
People from Brzozów County
20th-century Polish historians
Polish women historians